Genucla is the name of an ancient fortress of the Getae, located on the riverbank of the Danube or on an island on the river. It is mentioned by Dio Cassius in his History of Rome (Historia Romana), in Book LI (51), chapter 26. The author describes the military campaign of Marcus Licinius Crassus to conquer Moesia. During this campaign he lays siege to the fortress Genucla, which was under the rule of Getaen king Zyraxes.

Dio Cassius said:

The name of the fortress, in the form "Genuklo", appears also in the texts inscribed on the Sinaia lead plates, discovered in Sinaia at the beginning of the 20th century.

References 

Dacian_towns